Château Talbot is a winery in the Saint-Julien appellation of the Bordeaux region of France. Château Talbot is also the name of the red wine produced by this property. It was classified as one of ten Quatrièmes Crus Classés (Fourth Growths) in the Bordeaux Wine Official Classification of 1855.

History
The Château used to be the property of Sir John Talbot, Governor of Aquitaine, Earl of Shrewsbury,  in the 15th century. The property belonged to the Marquis of Aux for several decades, receiving its first Cocks & Féret lists in 1846 and 1855 and fourth growth classification in 1855, was then bought by Monsieur A. Claverie in 1899, before being acquired by Désiré Cordier in 1917. His son Georges, then his grandson Jean inherited the property and since his death in 1993 the present owners are his daughters Lorraine Rustmann and Nancy Bignon-Cordier, the fourth generation of the Cordier family.

Production
The vineyard area of Chateau Talbot extends , located a short distance from the Gironde estuary, is among the largest in Bordeaux. The vineyard is on fine gravelly rises, which are well drained. The distribution of red wine grape varieties is 68% Cabernet Sauvignon, 28% Merlot and 4% Petit Verdot. The average age of the vines is 42 years old with a 45 hl/ha yield.
All the grapes are harvested by hand with no fewer than 180 grape-pickers and may be fermented either in wood or stainless steel tanks.

Château Talbot produces three wines; an eponymous grand vin, a second wine called Connétable de Talbot released since the 1979 vintage, respectively aged 15 and 12 months in oak barrel, and one of the Médoc's oldest dry white wines, Caillou Blanc.

See also
John Talbot, 1st Earl of Shrewsbury

References

External links 
Château Talbot official site 

Bordeaux wine producers